John Perle (died 1402), of Dorchester, Dorset, was an English politician.

Family
He was the son of MP, Walter Perle.

Career
He was a Member (MP) of the Parliament of England for Dorchester
in February 1388 and for Dorset in 1394.

References

14th-century births
1402 deaths
English MPs February 1388
Members of the Parliament of England for Dorchester
English MPs 1394